Salawati is one of the four major islands in the Raja Ampat Islands in West Papua, Indonesia.

It may also refer to:
Salawati Daud, Indonesian communist politician
Salawati language, part of Ma'ya language

See also
Salawat (disambiguation)
Salavat (disambiguation)